The 1987 GP Ouest-France was the 51st edition of the GP Ouest-France cycle race and was held on 25 August 1987. The race started and finished in Plouay. The race was won by Gilbert Duclos-Lassalle of the Vétements Z–Peugeot team.

General classification

References

1987
1987 in road cycling
1987 in French sport